Valadares Gaia Futebol Clube is a Portuguese football club based in Valadares, in the Grande Porto.

Current squad

Honours
Supertaça de Portugal de Futebol Feminino
 Champions: 2015–16

References

External links
 

Women's football clubs in Portugal
Campeonato Nacional de Futebol Feminino teams